kanF may refer to:

 2-Deoxystreptamine N-acetyl-D-glucosaminyltransferase, an enzyme
 2-Deoxystreptamine glucosyltransferase, an enzyme